Aleksandra Romanova (born December 26, 1990) is a Kazakhstani hurdler. She competed at the 2016 Summer Olympics in the women's 400 metres hurdles race; her time of 59.36 seconds in the heats did not qualify her for the semifinals.

References

External links
 
 

1990 births
Living people
Kazakhstani female hurdlers
Olympic athletes of Kazakhstan
Athletes (track and field) at the 2016 Summer Olympics